Sheldon Weinig (born in New York City) is an American businessman who studied at Columbia University, where he received his doctorate and served as a professor. In 1957, he founded Materials Research Corporation (MRC), a global manufacturer and supplier of  specialized semiconductor materials and equipment.

Early years
Sheldon Weinig attended Stuyvesant High School, a magnet school in New York. After completing high school, he served in the United States Army for two years and  received his education on the GI Bill and was awarded his doctorate in metallurgy from Columbia University in 1955.

Career
Weinig served as a professor at Cooper Union and NYU for several years and then went on to found Materials Research Corporation.

MRC introduced leading-edge manufacturing equipment to the  semiconductor industry. 

In 1989, Sony acquired MRC.  The U.S. Government objected to the sale but the company needed a large infusion of capital  and no American-owned company was prepared to make the investment to purchase MRC and keep it (and its technology) intact. 

Weinig remained with Sony nearly 7 years as Vice Chairman for Engineering and Manufacturing of Sony America.  He retired from Sony in 1995 and has been an adjunct professor at Columbia University and SUNY, Stony Brook where he teaches a bridge course between academia and the industrial world.

Weinig retired as Vice Chairman of Engineering and Manufacturing of Sony America in 1996 and became an adjunct professor at Columbia University as well as the State University of New York at Stony Brook.

Publications
In 2018 Weinig published a book entitled Rule Breaker - An Entrepreneur's Manifesto.

Awards and recognition
1980Awarded the SEMMY Award, by the Semiconductor Equipment and Materials Institute
1984Inducted into the National Academy of Engineering for "the development of high purity, highly characterized materials, and technological processing equipment for electronic and metallurgical applications" 
1990Elected to the International Technology Institute’s Hall of Fame for Engineering, Science and Technology
1988Awarded the rank of Chevalier dans l’Ordre National de la Legion d’Honneur by the Government of France
He also received three honorary doctorates from St. Thomas Aquinas (law), Adelphi University (Science) and the State university of New York at Stony Brook. (Science)

References

External links
 SEMI Oral History Interview: Sheldon Weinig, Interviewed by Craig Addison
 Sony to Acquire New York Concern
 The Guys in White Hats from Sony, Dr. Sheldon Weinig
 The Challenge of Keeping U.S. Technology at Home, Andrew Pollack
 Life Without Layoffs, Inc. Magazine
 Math for America

Living people
American manufacturing businesspeople
Columbia School of Engineering and Applied Science alumni
Members of the United States National Academy of Engineering
Year of birth missing (living people)